Mahallam is a village in Faisalabad, Punjab, Pakistan, with a number of 439GB.

Villages in Faisalabad District